The Roman Catholic Diocese of Quibdó is a diocese located in the city of Quibdó in the Ecclesiastical province of Santa Fe de Antioquia in Colombia.

History
14 November 1952: Established as Apostolic Vicariate of Quibdó from the Diocese of Antioquía and Apostolic Prefecture of Chocó
30 April 1990: Promoted as Diocese of Quibdó

Ordinaries
Vicars Apostolic of Quibdó 
Pedro Grau y Arola, C.M.F. † (24 Mar 1953 – 6 Jun 1983) Retired
Jorge Iván Castaño Rubio, C.M.F. (6 Jun 1983 – 30 Apr 1990) Appointed, Bishop of Quibdó (see below)
Bishops of Quibdó 
Jorge Iván Castaño Rubio, C.M.F. (30 Apr 1990 – 16 Feb 2001) Appointed, Auxiliary Bishop of Medellín
Fidel León Cadavid Marin (25 Jul 2001 – 2 Feb 2011) Appointed, Bishop of Sonsón-Rionegro
Juan Carlos Barreto Barreto (30 Jan 2013 – present)

See also
Roman Catholicism in Colombia

Sources

External links
 GCatholic.org

Roman Catholic dioceses in Colombia
Roman Catholic Ecclesiastical Province of Santa Fe de Antioquia
Christian organizations established in 1952
Roman Catholic dioceses and prelatures established in the 20th century
1952 establishments in Colombia